Joseph Gerard Marcel Pelletier (December 6, 1927 – May 13, 2017) was a Canadian professional ice hockey goaltender who played eight games in the National Hockey League: six with the Chicago Black Hawks and two with the New York Rangers. He spent the majority of his career with the Victoria Cougars of the Western Hockey League.

After his retirement as a player in 1967, Pelletier spent more than forty years in management and as a scout with the NHL Philadelphia Flyers and Boston Bruins.

Pelletier died on May 13, 2017 at the age of 89.

References

External links

1927 births
2017 deaths
Baltimore Clippers players
Boston Bruins scouts
Canadian ice hockey goaltenders
Chicago Blackhawks players
Sportspeople from Drummondville
New York Rangers players
Philadelphia Flyers scouts
Ice hockey people from Quebec